Henry the Pious may refer to:
 Henry III, Holy Roman Emperor (1017–56)
 Henry II the Pious, Duke of Wrocław (1196/1207–1241) and High Duke of Poland (1238–1241)
 Henry IV, Duke of Saxony (1473–1541)